Elmer Joseph Koestner (November 30, 1885 – October 27, 1959) was a Major League Baseball pitcher who played for two seasons. He played for the Cleveland Naps in 1910 and the Chicago Cubs and Cincinnati Reds in 1914.

External links

1885 births
1959 deaths
People from Ford County, Illinois
Major League Baseball pitchers
Cleveland Naps players
Chicago Cubs players
Cincinnati Reds players
Baseball players from Illinois
Bloomington Bloomers players
Los Angeles Angels (minor league) players
Portland Beavers players
Venice Tigers players
Wichita Witches players
Colorado Springs Millionaires players
St. Joseph Drummers players
Indianapolis Indians players
Wichita Jobbers players
People from Fairbury, Illinois